Seo is an administrative unit known as a union council of Kohistan District in the Khyber Pakhtunkhwa province of Pakistan.

District Kohistan has four Tehsils: Dassu, Pattan, Palas and Kandia. Each comprises a certain number of union councils. There are 38 union councils in Kohistan District.

See also 

 Kohistan District, Pakistan

External links
Khyber-Pakhtunkhwa Government website section on Lower Dir
United Nations

Kohistan District, Pakistan
Populated places in Kohistan District, Pakistan
Union councils of Khyber Pakhtunkhwa
Union Councils of Kohistan District, Pakistan